Whitney Sharpe (born January 5, 1990) is an American soccer defender, who last played for BeNe League club AFC Ajax, and is currently as assistant coach for the Iowa State Cyclones.

Club career

Ajax
Before signing for Ajax in January 2013, Whitney Sharpe played Soccer at college level in the United States, playing for UCLA, Texas Tech and Loyola Marymount. She played a full season for Ajax helping the Women's team of Ajax to win their first trophy, by winning the KNVB Women's Cup.

International career
She is a member of the U.S. Women's national team, and has played on every youth level from Under-15 to Under-20

Honours

Club
Ajax
 KNVB Women's Cup: 2014

Individual
 NSCAA Adidas All American Youth Team: 2006 & 2007
 Gatorade Player of the Year for Iowa: 2007 & 2008
 First Team Parade All American: 2008
 No.16 National Recruit by Soccer Buzz

References

External links
Sharpe profile on club website
Sharpe profile on women's Netherlands
Sharpe profile on U.S. Women's National team website

1990 births
Living people
Expatriate footballers in the Netherlands
Expatriate women's footballers in the Netherlands
American expatriates in the Netherlands
American women's soccer players
Soccer players from Iowa
People from West Des Moines, Iowa
Eredivisie (women) players
AFC Ajax (women) players
Women's association football defenders
UCLA Bruins women's soccer players
Texas Tech Red Raiders women's soccer players
Loyola Marymount Lions women's soccer players